is a passenger railway station located in the city of Tokushima, Tokushima Prefecture, Japan. It is operated by JR Shikoku and has the station number "M02".

Lines
Only local trains stop at the station.

Layout
The station consists of an island platform serving two tracks. The station building is unstaffed and serves only as a waiting room. The island platform is accessed by a level crossing and ramp. A passing loop runs between track 1 and the station building.

Platforms

Adjacent stations

History
After the company was nationalized in 1 September 1917, Japanese Government Railways (JGR) took over control of the station and operated it as part of the Komatsushima Light Railway and later, the Komatsushima Line. With the privatization of Japanese National Railways (JNR), the successor of JGR, on 1 April 1987, JR Shikoku took over control of the station.

Passenger statistics
In fiscal 2019, the station was used by an average of 633 passengers daily

Surrounding area
Tokushima City Hall Hachiman Branch
Hachiman Elementary School, Tokushima City
Tokushima City Hachiman Junior High School
Tokushima Prefectural Jonan High School
Tokushima Prefectural Tokushima Visual Support School, Tokushima

See also
List of railway stations in Japan

References

External links

 JR Shikoku timetable

Railway stations in Tokushima Prefecture
Railway stations in Japan opened in 1913
Tokushima (city)